Carmel Convent High School  is a school near Badlapur, Thane district, India. It was founded in 1990 by the sisters of the Congregation of Mother of Carmel, which is the first indigenous Congregation of India, founded in Kerala in 1866. 

This school is coeducational and governed by Sister Smita as of 10/12/2022. The school is located on the Katrap highways, close to and IndianOil petrol pump, D-Mart and is  1O miles from Badlapur station. The admission seats versus applications ratio are 1:4.

This school divides its students in four houses:
 St.Euphrasia (Yellow)
 St.Chavara (Blue)
 Mt.Carmel (Green)
 Mother Teresa (Red)

The school is affiliated with Maharashtra State Board of Secondary Education, Vashi Divisional Board, Navi Mumbai.

Activities include singing competitions, dance competitions, and sports like football and basketball. Teams are formed according to the houses and points are given for each win, the winner house gets the school trophy.
The school also hosts inter-school competitions. Each student here is taught and treated with respect.
This school also takes its  students to picnics each year to relieve the stress of the students in a more social way
The School has a Council of Students consisting of 36 members which are elected every year from the 8th, 9th and 10th standards. The school has various clubs like
 Cultural and Literary Club (LIBRO CLUB)
 Science and Mathematics Club (SIGMA)
 Social Service Club
 Sports club
 Eco Club 
The school has a playground and three school buildings.
In 2014-15 Carmel Convent High School Badlapur celebrated its Silver Jubilee year under the excellent guidance of Former Principal Rev. Sister Mercilin. A number of progress has been taking place after its establishment.

References

Carmelite educational institutions
High schools and secondary schools in Maharashtra
Christian schools in Maharashtra
Schools in Thane district
Educational institutions established in 1990
1990 establishments in Maharashtra